Arıca is a village in Batman Province in southeastern Turkey. It is located in the district of Gercüş and the historical region of Tur Abdin.

In the village, there are churches of Mor Aho and Mor Dimet, Mor Jacob, and Mor Barsaumo. The Monastery of Mor Barsaumo is also located north of the village.

The village is populated by Assyrians and by Kurds of the Kercoz tribe. In 2021, the population was 344.

Etymology
The Syriac name of the village is derived from "kafro" ("village" in Syriac) and "elayto" ("upper" in Syriac), thus Kafro `Elayto translates to "upper village". This name serves to distinguish the village from Kafro Tahtayto ("lower village" in Syriac).

History
Amidst the Assyrian genocide, in 1915, Kafro Elayto was populated by 80 Assyrian families and 30 Kurdish families. After a five-day siege by a Kurdish force led by Yusuf Agha, most of the village's Assyrian population were massacred and their houses destroyed, and a few survivors fled to Inwardo. The Assyrians later returned, and roughly 60 Assyrian families are recorded in the 1980s, however, they were forced to flee due to the Kurdish–Turkish conflict, and as of 2012 there are no remaining Assyrians.

Notable people
Mor Julius Yeshu Cicek (1942-2005), Syriac Orthodox Archbishop of Central Europe
Mehmet Şimşek (b. 1967), Turkish politician

References
Notes

Citations

Bibliography

Villages in Gercüş District
Historic Assyrian communities in Turkey
Tur Abdin
Places of the Assyrian genocide

Kurdish settlements in Batman Province